Wilhelm Russ was a  coaster that was built in 1921 by Stettiner Oderwerke AG, Stettin, Germany. In 1945, she was seized by the Allies at Eckernförde, passed to the Ministry of War Transport (MoWT) and was renamed Empire Cony. In 1947, she was sold into merchant service and renamed Elsie Beth. In 1950, she was sold back to her original managers and renamed Wilhelm Russ. She served until 1958 when she was scrapped.

Description
The ship was built in 1921 by Stettiner Oderwerke AG, Stettin.

The engine was built byStettiner Oderwerke.

History
Wilhlem Russ was built for Schiffart-und Assekuranz Gesellschaft GmbH. Her port of registry was Hamburg and the Code Letters ROBM were allocated. She was operated under the management of Ernst Russ, Hamburg. In 1934, her Code Letters were changed to DHZY.

In May 1945, Wilhelm Russ was captured by the Allies at Eckernförde. She was passed to the MoWT and renamed Empire Cony. The Code Letters GKVM and United Kingdom Official Number 180660 were allocated. She was operated under the management of C Strubin & Co Ltd. Her port of registry was London.

In 1947, Empire Cony was sold to Storeship Transport Co, London and was renamed Elsie Beth. In 1950, she was sold to Ernest Russ, Hamburg and was renamed Wilhelm Russ. She served until 1958, being sold for scrap on 20 August. The ship was scrapped in Hamburg.

References

External links
Photo of Wilhelm Russ

1921 ships
Ships built in Stettin
Steamships of Germany
Merchant ships of Germany
World War II merchant ships of Germany
Ministry of War Transport ships
Empire ships
Steamships of the United Kingdom
Merchant ships of the United Kingdom
Steamships of West Germany
Merchant ships of West Germany